Antonio De Gaetano (18 May 1934 – 21 August 2007) was an Italian male racewalker who competed at the 1960 Summer Olympics. He had a son, Giuseppe, who was also a racewalker.

See also
 Italy at the IAAF World Race Walking Cup

References

External links
 

1934 births
2007 deaths
Athletes (track and field) at the 1960 Summer Olympics
Italian male racewalkers
Olympic athletes of Italy